The Pohokura field is an oil and gas field located 4 km offshore of north Taranaki in New Zealand, in approximately 30 m of water.

The field has 6 offshore and 3 onshore wells, with the production station located on shore, adjacent to the Motunui methanol plant.  The production station is unmanned, and is operated from a control room in New Plymouth.  The first commercial production was in September 2006.

In 2009, Pohokura was the largest gas-producing field in New Zealand, producing 42% of total production.

Pohokura is owned by OMV (74%) and Todd Energy (26%), and is operated by OMV.

See also 
 Energy in New Zealand
 Oil and gas industry in New Zealand

References

External links 
 Todd Energy website
 Shell Todd Oil Pohokura website

Zealandia
Geography of Taranaki
Geography of the New Zealand seabed
Oil fields of New Zealand
Natural gas fields in New Zealand
Buildings and structures in Taranaki